(meaning "The Collection") is a compilation album by the Irish folk group Clannad. It consists of fourteen of their traditional recordings (originally included on the 1975 album Clannad 2 and the 1976 album Dúlamán) and was released by Gael Linn Records.

Track listing 
"Dúlamán" *
"Eleanor Plunkett"
"Two Sisters" *
"Fairly Shot of Her"
"Siúil a Rúin" *
"Dhéanainn Súgradh"
"The Galtee Hunt" *
"By Chance It Was"
"Rince Philib a' Cheoil"
"Gaoth Barra na dTonn"
"Cumha Eoghain Rua Uí Néill" *
"An Gabhar Bán (The White Goat)"
"Chuaigh Mé na Rosann"
"Coinleach Ghlas an Fhómhair"

All tracks originally included on Clannad 2, except * included on Dúlamán.

References

1998 greatest hits albums
Clannad compilation albums